The Python Minefield Breaching System is used by the British Army to clear minefields. It replaces the Giant Viper, and has the ability to clear a safe lane in minefields 180–200m long and 7.3 m wide through which vehicles can pass.

The system works by firing a single rocket from a launcher mounted on a 136 kilogramme trailer which has to be towed to the edge of the mined area. Attached to the rocket motor 250 mm L9 53 kg is a 228 m long hose packed with 1455 kg of pe6/al explosive. After the hose lands on the ground it detonates and destroys over 90% of mines along its entire length. The 10% that are not destroyed are simply pushed aside to safety. It can be used in tandem to defeat double impulse mines or mines of greater depth. It also contains a 9 kg high explosive substitute at the end with a .9 kg booster of pe4.

Python has been used operationally with the Trojan AVRE in Afghanistan.  During Operation Moshtarak the Royal Engineers attempted to use this traditional mine clearance equipment in the Counter-IED role in support of a major British Army advance.

See also
 Mine-clearing line charge

References

External links
 .

Military engineering vehicles of the United Kingdom
Mine warfare countermeasures